This is a list of mayors of Regensburg. It includes the First Mayors (Erster Bürgermeister) and Lord Mayors of Regensburg (Oberbürgermeister der Stadt Regensburg) since 1811/1818.

Regensburg
Politics of Bavaria
 
Bavaria-related lists